Patricia Labra Besserer (born 25 April 1986) is a Chilean lawyer who was elected as a member of the Chilean Constitutional Convention.

References

External links
 BCN Profile

Living people
1986 births
Chilean women lawyers
21st-century Chilean politicians
Catholic University of the Most Holy Conception alumni
University for Development alumni
National Renewal (Chile) politicians
Members of the Chilean Constitutional Convention
People from Santiago
21st-century Chilean women politicians
21st-century Chilean lawyers